This is a list of significant wolf attacks on humans worldwide, by decade and century, in reverse chronological order.

A  indicates a fatal attack.

2020s

2010s

2000s

1900s

1800s

1700s

1600s

1400s

1300s

See also
 List of fatal dog attacks
 Fatal dog attacks in the United States
 List of wolf attacks in North America

References

Bibliography
 
 
 
 
 
 
 
 

wolf